Ellen Clark (1915–1988) was an Australian carcinologist and naturalist, whose work focused on crustaceans and ants Clark studied, named, described and published many of the Australian freshwater crayfish species. By 1939, she was reported to have identified more than half the known species of Australian crayfish. She conducted research about blood groups in crustaceans and made a significant contribution to the study of crayfish genera. She was the first woman to publish in the Memoirs of the National Museum of Victoria.

Ellen Clark's crayfish, Euastacus clarkae, was named after Clark in recognition of her pioneering parastacid studies. Clark's work has had a lasting legacy and is still being debated in scientific papers.

References

Australian scientists
1915 births
1988 deaths
Women naturalists
20th-century Australian women